Vaai Kozhuppu is a 1989 Indian Tamil-language comedy thriller film, directed by Muktha Srinivasan and produced by Ramaswamy Govind and Muktha S. Ravi. The film stars Pandiarajan, Gautami, Janagaraj and S. S. Chandran. It was released on 17 February 1989.

Plot

Cast 
Pandiarajan as Vasu
Gautami as Usha
Janagaraj as Baskar
Livingston as Murali, Sugavanam's henchman
S. S. Chandran as Vasu's father
Jai Ganesh as Murthy
T. S. Raghavendra as Chokkalingam
Kitty as Sugavanam, proprietor of Grand Hotel
Manorama as Mangamma, Vasu's step mother
Vadivukkarasi as Murthy's wife
Bayilvan Ranganathan as Ramani, Police Inspector
Vedhavathi
Disco Shanti as Shanthi
Haja Sheriff as hospital compounder

Soundtrack 
Soundtrack was composed by Chandrabose. Lyrics were written by Vairamuthu.

Reception 
The Indian Express wrote, "Gopu-Babu's dialogues follow the stageplay formula of a joke a minute and Janakaraj's bent in this enterprise and Pandyaraj's easy manner put Vaay Kozhuppu out of trouble's way".

References

External links 
 

1980s comedy thriller films
1980s Tamil-language films
1989 films
Films directed by Muktha Srinivasan
Films scored by Chandrabose (composer)
Indian comedy thriller films